Pyridopyrimidine is an organic hetero bicyclic chemical compound consisting of pyridine ring fused orthogonally at any position to a pyrimidine ring.

See also 

 List of  pyridopyrimidines

References